Strange Fits of Passion is a 1999 Australian film directed by Elise McCredie and starring Michela Noonan. It is about a young woman determined to lose her virginity.

References

External links

Strange Fits of Passion at Oz Movies

Australian comedy-drama films
1990s English-language films
1990s Australian films